Dennis Lindsey is an American professional basketball executive. He currently holds an advisory role with the Utah Jazz. After holding the role of general manager from 2012 to 2019, Lindsey was then promoted to Executive Vice President of Basketball Operations in May 2019 up until the start of the 2021 season where he later stepped down.

Education 
Lindsey graduated from Baylor University in 1992 and U.S. Sports Academy in 1994. He played college basketball for Baylor's basketball team as a guard.

Career
Lindsey joined the Houston Rockets during the summer of 1996 as a video coordinator and scout and worked his way up the team's management ladder. He was named the Rockets's director of basketball development in 1998 and was promoted to director of player personnel in 1999. Lindsey was then elevated to the position of vice president of basketball operations/player personnel in 2002. He then became the team's assistant general manager.

He was then an assistant general manager for the San Antonio Spurs from 2007 to 2012. After that, Lindsey became the general manager of the Utah Jazz. In the summer of 2021, he stepped down from being executive vice president of basketball operations and transitioned to an advisory role. 

=

References

Living people
Baylor Bears men's basketball players
National Basketball Association general managers
Utah Jazz executives
1969 births
Place of birth missing (living people)